Deepal Gunawardene (born 21 October 1969) is a Sri Lankan former first class cricketer. He is now an umpire and stood in a tour match between Sri Lanka Board President's XI and West Indians in October 2015. On 5 December 2019, he umpired in his first Twenty20 International (T20I) match, between Nepal and Bhutan in the men's tournament at the 2019 South Asian Games.

See also
 List of Twenty20 International cricket umpires

References

External links
 

1969 births
Living people
Sri Lankan cricketers
Sri Lankan cricket umpires
Sri Lankan Twenty20 International cricket umpires
Cricketers from Colombo
Sri Lanka Police Sports Club cricketers